Karla is the feminine form of Karl.

People with this given name include;

 Karla Álvarez (1972–2013), Mexican actress
 Karla Aponte (born 1998), Puerto Rican model
 Karla Avelar (born 1978), Salvadoran activist
 Karla Barrera (born 1984), Puerto Rican windsurfer
 Karla Bernard, Canadian politician
 Karla Bigham (born 1979), Minnesota politician
 Karla Black, Scottish sculptor
 Karla Boddy (born 1985), British racing cyclist
 Karla Bonoff (born 1951), American singer-songwriter
 Karla van der Boon (born 1968), Dutch water polo goalkeeper
 Karla Borger (born 1988), German beach volleyball player
 Karla Borovská (born 1932), Czech speed skater
 Karla Burns (1954–2021), American mezzo-soprano and actress
 Karla Cabello (born 1997), Cuban-American singer-songwriter
 Karla Cardoso (born 1981), Brazilian judoka
 Karla Carrillo (born 1988), Mexican beauty pageant
 Karla Conga (born 1994), Peruvian footballer
 Karla Conway (born 1946), American model
 Karla Cossío (born 1985), Mexican actress
 Karla Costa (born 1978), Brazilian basketball player
 Karla Crome (born 1988), English actress
 Karla Cubias (born 1983), Salvadoran singer
 Karla Cuevas, Honduran justice minister
 Karla DeVito (born 1953), American singer
 Karla Drenner (born 1961), American academic and politician in Georgia
 Karla Echenique (born 1986), Dominican Republic volleyball player
 Karla Erbová (born 1933), Czech writer
 Karla Estrada (born 1974), Filipina actress and singer
 Karla Fernández (born 1977), Venezuelan weightlifter
 Karla Frister (fl. 1958–62), German coxswain
 Karla González Cruz (born 1976), Mexican politician
 Karla Gower (born 1957), American public relations professor
 Karla Grant, Australian presenter, producer and journalist
 Karla M. Gray (1947–2017), American judge, first woman to serve as a state Chief Justice
 Karla Gutöhrlein née Knospe (born 1910), German dancer and film actress
 Karla Hart, Australian Noongar movie director and presenter
 Karla Henry (born 1986), Filipino-Canadian beauty pageant
 Karla Höcker (1901–1992), German writer and musician
 Karla F.C. Holloway (born 1949), American legal scholar
 Karla Homolka (born 1970), Canadian serial killer
 Karla Huston (born 1949), American poet
 Karla Jay (born 1947), American feminist and gender studies academic
 Karla Jiménez (born 1982), Mexican beauty pageant
 Karla Karch-Gailus (born 1964), Canadian basketball player
 Karla Kienzl (born 1922), Austrian luger
 Karla Kirkegaard (born 1954), American geneticist and microbiologist
 Karla Klarić (born 1994), Croatian volleyball player
 Karla Kuskin (1932–2009), American children's author, poet, and illustrator
 Karla LaVey (born 1952), American radio host, former High Priestess of the Church of Satan
 Karla Linke (born 1960), East German breaststroke swimmer
 Karla López (born 1977), Swedish Green Party politician
 Karla MacFarlane (born 1969), Canadian (Nova Scotia) politician
 Karla Martínez (born 1976), Mexican TV Show Host
 Karla Mayer (1918–?), German Nazi death camp guard
 Karla Monroig (born 1979), Puerto Rican actress, model and television host
 Karla Moreno (born 1988), Guatemalan weightlifter
 Karla Moskowitz (born ca. 1942), American justice
 Karla Cheatham Mosley (born 1981), American actress and singer
 Karla Nelsen (born 1965), American bodybuilder
 Karla Nieto (born 1995), Mexican footballer
 Karla Ortiz (born 1991), Bolivian volleyball player
 Karla Peijs (born 1944), Dutch politician, minister of Transport and Waterworks 
 Karla Peniche (born 1988), Mexican model
 Karla Poewe (born 1941), German-born American anthropologist and historian
 Karla Pollmann (born 1963), German classical scholar
 Karla Pretorius (born 1990), South African netball player
 Karla Quinn (born 1988), British figure skater
 Karla Reuter (born 1984), Australian soccer player
 Karla Roffeis (born 1958), German volleyball player
 Karla Rothstein (born 1966), American architect
 Karla Rubilar (born 1977), Chilean politician
 Karla Satchell, American microbiologist
 Karla Schmidt (born 1974), German writer and editor
 Karla Schramm (1891–1980), American film actress
 Karla Rosa da Silva (born 1984), Brazilian pole vaulter
 Karla Šitić (born 1992), Croatian distance swimmer
 Karla Šlechtová (born 1977), Czech politician and economist
 Karla Souza (born 1985), Mexican actress
 Karla Stephens-Tolstoy (born 1969), Canadian businesswoman
 Karla Suárez (born 1969), Cuban writer
 Karla Tamburrelli, American actress and television producer
 Karla Tritten (born 1978), Canadian wheelchair basketball player
 Karla Faye Tucker (1959–1998), the first woman to be executed in the United States since 1984
 Karla Urrutia (born 1994), Mexican squash player
 Karla Villalobos (born 1986), Costa Rican footballer
 Karla Villarreal Benassini (born 1975), Mexican politician
 Karla Cornejo Villavicencio (born 1989), Ecuadorian-American writer
 Karla Vreš (born 1999), Croatian basketball player
 Karla Wheelock (born 1968), Mexican mountaineer, writer, and lecturer
 Karla Jessen Williamson (born 1954), Greenlandic epistemologist and Director of the Arctic Institute of North America
 Karla Woisnitza (born 1952), German artist
 Karla Zadnik, American optometrist

Fictional characters
 Karla, a character in Jacqueline Susann's novel Once Is Not Enough
 Karla, a fictional male Soviet Intelligence officer in several novels by John le Carré
Karla, a fictional swordmaster from the tactical role-playing game Fire Emblem: The Blazing Blade
 Karla Bentham, a character in the BBC series Waterloo Road
 Karla-Heinrike Langer, a fictional character from Strike Witches
 Karla Sofen, Marvel Comics supervillain known as Moonstone
 Karla the Zebra, a fictional zebra on Mama Mirabelle's Home Movies

See also

 Kalla (name)
 Karla Caves, a complex of ancient Buddhist rock-cut caves in India
 Karla (disambiguation), for other uses
Karli (name)
Karlo (name)
Karly
Karola
Karra (name)
Kharla Chávez

Feminine given names